is a Japanese singer and actress. She is the leader of the Japanese rock band Lovendor. From 2002 to 2013, she was one of the main vocalists of the girl group Morning Musume and participated in other music acts under the Hello! Project name.

Career

2001–2013: Morning Musume

Tanaka auditioned for a spot in Morning Musume's 5th Generation in 2001 and passed, but had to leave the training camp for being under the age limit. She attempted again in 2002 for a position in the 6th Generation and passed along with members Eri Kamei and Sayumi Michishige. She provided the main vocals for the single "Shabondama". She was featured in two solo versions of "Memory Seishun no Hikari" on a fan club release CD.

In 2003, Tanaka became a member of the sub-unit Aa!, along with Miyabi Natsuyaki and Airi Suzuki, two Hello! Project Kids members. They released one single, "First Kiss", on October 29, 2003. Later, in 2004, she participated in singing "All for One & One for All!", a collaboration single released by all Hello! Project artists under the name "H.P. All Stars." She also sang the coupling track, "Suki ni Naccha Ikenai Hito", with Suzuki and Megumi Murakami.

On March 28, 2008, Tanaka made her voice acting debut as Kirara, the main character in Sanrio's anime Onegai My Melody Kirara, the fourth My Melody series. The show premiered on April 6, 2008.

In 2008, Tanaka became the leader of Hello Project's new unit High-King.

In 2009–2010 Tanaka voiced the main/title character of the anime series, Kaitō Reinya. The character had been modeled on Tanaka. The show began airing on January 8, 2010.

Tanaka graduated from Morning Musume on May 21, 2013, and subsequently concentrated her activities on her rock band Lovendor.

2013–present: Lovendor and solo activities

Personal life
Tanaka was born in Fukuoka Prefecture, Japan. Her brother is seven years younger than her.

Releases

Studio Albums

Digital singles

Collaborations/others

Photobooks

DVDs 
 
 Real Challenge!! (Released October 2008)

Acting

Movies 
 
  - Voice of Fairy

Theater

TV shows 
All shows listed were broadcast by TV Tokyo, with the exception of Kaitō Reinya, which was aired on ANN's KBC TV channel, Hanbun ESPer which aired on FujiTVTWO and Sūgaku Joshi Gakuen which aired on Nippon Television.

Radio

Publications

References

External links 

 Official blog
 Official profile
 Official 'LoVendoЯ' Site (feat. Reina Tanaka as a member).

1989 births
Aa! members
21st-century Japanese women singers
21st-century Japanese singers
Japanese child singers
Japanese women pop singers
Japanese actresses
Japanese child actresses
Japanese voice actresses
Japanese musical theatre actresses
Japanese sopranos
Living people
Morning Musume members
People from Fukuoka
Musicians from Fukuoka Prefecture